The County of East-Frisia (Frisian: Greefskip Eastfryslân; Dutch: Graafschap Oost-Friesland) was a county (though ruled by a prince after 1662) in the region of East Frisia in the northwest of the present-day German state of Lower Saxony.

County
Originally East Frisia was part of the larger Frisian realm. The Frisians had practically no higher authority above them. There did exist, though, respected families of chieftains (Häuptling), who aspired to increase their, mostly local, power and influence. In the 15th century, the Cirksena dynasty managed to establish its authority in practically all of East Frisia. In 1464, Ulrich I of East Frisia was raised to the status of Count by Frederick III, Holy Roman Emperor, and East Frisia became a county.

Origin of the county
In 1430, led by chieftain Edzard Cirksena of Greetsiel,  a freedom-alliance was formed against the ruling Focko Ukena. Together with his brother Ulrich, Edzard managed to remove the Ukena-faction from power. After the marriage in 1455 of Ulrich Cirksena with Theda Ukena, a granddaughter of his enemy, the majority of East Frisia was united. Only the Lordships of Jever and Friedeburg could maintain their independence. Sibet Attena, a nephew and aid to Ulrich received the lordships Esens, Stedesdorf and Wittmund, which together formed the Harlingerland. The Harlingerland did remain under the higher authority of the Cirksena family. Because Ocko I tom Brok had given the territory to the count of Holland in 1381, the status of the rulers of East Frisia was unclear. The ruler of East Frisia decided to improve his situation by turning directly to the Holy Roman Emperor. As a result, Emperor Frederick III raised Ulrich in 1464 to an imperial count. The emperor gave to Ulrich I the Imperial County in Norden, Emden, Emisgonien in East Frisia.

Consolidation of the County
After the death of Ulrich I, his widow Theda ruled in the name of their children, who were still minors. Theda managed to withstand the threats of Duke Charles the Bold of Burgundy and count Gerd of Oldenburg. In 1481 she added the lordship of Fredeburg to the county. Under her son Edzard I, there were quarrels with the chieftains of the Harlingerland and the Jeverland and with the prince-bishop of Münster and the Hansa-city of Hamburg. Jeverland and Harlingerland remained independent, but Butjadingen became subject to East Frisian authority.

The struggle for the Frisian lands
A new situation was created with the appointment of George of Saxony as imperial stadtholder of Friesland by Maximilian I, Holy Roman Emperor. This appointment was the last attempt to unify all of Frisia under one ruler. Count Edzard recognised George as his feudal lord. Rebellions broke out, however, in Friesland and the Groninger Ommelanden. In 1506 Edzard broke his allegiance to George, forming an alliance with Groningen instead. Edzard was now recognised by the Groninger Ommelanden as its ruler. In 1512, primogeniture was introduced to preserve the newly created unity. In 1515 the successors of George of Saxony relinquished their rights to Friesland to Duke Charles of Burgundy, the later emperor Charles V. The conflict ended in 1517 in a treaty between Edzard and Charles, in which Charles recognised the possessions of Edzard as an imperial county.

The Reformation
After 1519 the Protestant Reformation made its way into East Frisia, initially with a very tolerant view towards Roman Catholicism. After Edzard I was succeeded by his son Enno II in 1528, the suppression of Catholicism began. Most East-Frisian monasteries and abbeys were secularised. Aside from this, a wide rift emerged between the Lutherans and the Calvinists.

Marriage-politics and territorial size
In 1517 an agreement was signed in which the marriage between Enno II and Maria of Jever was planned. But Enno II broke the agreement and instead married Anna of Oldenburg in 1529. In this marriage, Butjadingen was given to Oldenburg, and in return, Oldenburg relinquished its claims to Jever. In response, Maria of Jever drove out the East Frisian occupiers of Jever in 1531, and in 1532 she recognised the Duke of Burgundy, Charles V as her feudal lord. The Harlingerland was loaned to the Duchy of Guelders.

Dutch intervention
The power of the count was put under pressure in the 16th century, partially because of the Dutch Revolt. The city of Emden became a popular destination for Dutch Calvinists fleeing from religious persecution in the Netherlands. Count Edzard II, however, was Lutheran. In 1595 the Dutch Republic interfered in the quarrel between the city and the count with the Treaty of Delfzijl, where the Lutheran count recognised the Dutch influence and the (Calvinistic) Reformed Church. Dutch troops were stationed in Emden and Leer.

In 1602, count Enno attempted to drive out the Dutch with support from the Emperor and the Spanish king, but he was rebuffed. In a new treaty in 1603 he was forced to accept the Dutch occupation and religious consequences for an undetermined amount of time. In the Thirty Years' War, Imperial troops entered the county in 1628. While they did not clash with the Dutch troops present in the county, the Dutch States-General did stop supplying the Eems valley.

Status after 1744
The territory fell to Prussia in 1744. Following the Emden Convention concluded on March 14, 1744 between the city of Emden and Frederick II of Prussia, the latter was allowed to march without resistance into East Frisia, when the last count Charles Edzard died on May 25 without children.

In 1807 it was annexed by France and added to the Kingdom of Holland as the department of East-Frisia. After France directly annexed the kingdom in 1810, the territory became part of the French Ems-Oriental department. In 1815 it was added to the Kingdom of Hannover. In present-day it is part of the German state of Lower Saxony.

See also

East Frisia
History of East Frisia
List of Counts of East Frisia
List of East Frisian people

References 

East Frisia
History of East Frisia
East Frisia
1460s establishments in the Holy Roman Empire
1464 establishments in Europe
1744 disestablishments in the Holy Roman Empire
Early Modern history of Germany
Former monarchies of Europe